The 1954–55 Texas Tech Red Raiders men's basketball team represented Texas Tech University in the Border Intercollegiate Athletic Association during the 1954–55 NCAA men's basketball season. The head coach was Polk Robison, his 8th year with the team.

References

Texas Tech Red Raiders basketball seasons
Texas Tech